The MacArthur Memorial is a memorial, museum, and research center about the life of General Douglas MacArthur. It consists of three buildings on MacArthur Square in Norfolk, Virginia.

MacArthur never lived in Norfolk but his mother, Mary Pinkney "Pinky" Hardy MacArthur, was born and raised in Norfolk. His mother's connection with Norfolk was why he decided to be buried there. The city of Norfolk's government built the memorial in the 1960s and have continued to own, renovate, and operate it due to a promise made between MacArthur and the then mayor of Norfolk, W. Fred Duckworth, in 1960. Many cities wanted MacArthur to be buried in their cities but Duckworth's offer was the most intriguing one to MacArthur. MacArthur agreed to turn over all of his papers, medals, and memorabilia to the city of Norfolk and agreed to be buried in Norfolk as long as he and his wife would be laid to rest within the memorial. Duckworth offered the former Norfolk City Hall building as a combined museum and mausoleum to honor MacArthur.

 Memorial – located in the former Norfolk City Hall building, the memorial houses the tomb of General MacArthur and his wife in the rotunda, and the museum that spans nine galleries about his life and career. Exhibits include photos, uniforms, flags, medals, weapons, personal artifacts, paintings, and sculpture. The Memorial also pays tribute to the men and women who served with General MacArthur in World War I, World War II, and the Korean War.
 Visitor Center – includes the MacArthur Memorial Theater showing a 27-minute movie about MacArthur's life, a special exhibit gallery, the general's personal staff car, and other vehicles from World War II, a gift shop, rest rooms, and offices.
 Jean MacArthur Research Center – houses the general's personal archives, memorabilia, and collections, including his trophies, medals, prizes, decorations, uniforms, flags, swords, battle souvenirs, personal papers, along with both official and other documents. The building also includes educational facilities and offices. It is open to researchers by appointment. Admission is free.

References

External links

 

Biographical museums in Virginia
Mausoleums in the United States
Military and war museums in Virginia
Monuments and memorials in Virginia
Memorial
Museums in Norfolk, Virginia
1964 establishments in Virginia